Egen is the surname of:

 Joseph L. Egen Jr, American World War II flying ace
 Kanzan Egen (1277–1360), Japanese Buddhist monk, founder of Myōshin-ji Temple 
 Markus Egen (1927–2021), German ice hockey player
 Nurbek Egen (born 1975), Kyrgyz and Russian film and TV director and screenwriter
 Uli Egen (born 1956), German ice hockey player

See also
 Gert van Egen (c. 1550–1612), Flemish sculptor
 Egan (disambiguation)
 Eagan (disambiguation)